Palos Heights is a station on Metra's SouthWest Service in Palos Heights, Illinois. In Metra's zone-based fare system, Palos Heights is in zone D. As of 2018, Palos Heights is the 160th busiest of Metra's 236 non-downtown stations, with an average of 232 weekday boardings.

As of January 16, 2023, Palos Heights is served by 28 trains (14 in each direction) on weekdays. Saturday service is currently suspended.

Bus connections
Pace
 769 Palos Heights/Oak Lawn-Soldier Field Express
 774 Palos Heights/Oak Lawn-Guaranteed Rate Field Express

References

External links

Metra stations in Illinois
Railway stations in Cook County, Illinois
Railway stations in the United States opened in 1986